Lieutenant-Colonel Frederick Miller VC (10 November 1831 – 17 February 1874) was an English recipient of the Victoria Cross, the highest and most prestigious award for gallantry in the face of the enemy that can be awarded to British and Commonwealth forces.

Details
Miller was 22 years old, and a lieutenant in the Royal Regiment of Artillery, British Army during the Crimean War when the following deed took place at the Battle of Inkerman for which he was awarded the VC.

Further information
He later achieved the rank of lieutenant-colonel. His VC is on display in the Lord Ashcroft Gallery at the Imperial War Museum, London.

References

 VC sale

Crimean War recipients of the Victoria Cross
British recipients of the Victoria Cross
Recipients of the Legion of Honour
Recipients of the Order of the Medjidie
British Army personnel of the Crimean War
Royal Artillery officers
People from Stratford-on-Avon District
1831 births
1874 deaths
British Army recipients of the Victoria Cross